Adrian Meronk (born 31 May 1993) is a Polish professional golfer who plays on the European Tour. He won the 2022 Horizon Irish Open, becoming the first Polish golfer to win on the European Tour.

Amateur career
Meronk was born in Germany. He attended East Tennessee State University from 2012 to 2016. Meronk represented Poland in the Eisenhower Trophy in 2012, 2014, 2016. In 2012 he was tied for 7th place as an individual. In 2016 Poland finished 8th with Meronk tied for 3rd place as an individual. He also played for Europe in the Arnold Palmer Cup in 2015 and 2016, being part of the winning team in 2016.

Professional career
Meronk turned professional after the 2016 Eisenhower Trophy. He played on the Challenge Tour in 2017 and was runner-up in the Ras Al Khaimah Golf Challenge, losing in a playoff to Jens Dantorp. He finished the season 30th in the rankings. He played on the Challenge Tour again in 2018, finishing 48th in the rankings with just one top-10 finish.

Meronk had a good start to the 2019 Challenge Tour season. He was tied for 7th place in his first two events and then solo 3rd in the D+D Real Czech Challenge. In September he had his first Challenge Tour win in the Open de Portugal, finishing two strokes ahead of Sebastián García Rodríguez. He finished the 2019 season 5th in the Challenge Tour Rankings to gain a place on the 2020 European Tour.

Meronk held the 54-hole lead at the Alfred Dunhill Championship in November 2020, but a final round 76 saw him drop into a share of second place; 4 shots behind eventual winner, Christiaan Bezuidenhout.

In July 2022, Meronk won the Horizon Irish Open to become the first Pole to win on the European Tour. He played the final four holes in 4-under-par to beat Ryan Fox by three shots. In December 2022, Meronk won his second title on the European Tour at the ISPS Handa Australian Open in by five shots over Adam Scott.

Amateur wins
2010 Polish Junior Championship, Polish Amateur
2011 Polish Junior Championship
2012 TOYA Polish Junior
2014 Polish Amateur, Inverness Intercollegiate, Wolfpack Intercollegiate (co-medalist)
2015 Bank of Tennessee Intercollegiate
2016 Southern Conference Championship

Source:

Professional wins (3)

European Tour wins (2)

1Co-sanctioned by the PGA Tour of Australasia

Challenge Tour wins (1)

Challenge Tour playoff record (0–1)

Results in major championships

CUT = missed the half-way cut
"T" = tied

Team appearances
Amateur
European Boys' Team Championship (representing Poland): 2008, 2009
Eisenhower Trophy (representing Poland): 2012, 2014, 2016
European Amateur Team Championship (representing Poland): 2015
Arnold Palmer Cup (representing Europe): 2015, 2016 (winners)

Professional
European Championships (representing Poland): 2018
Hero Cup (representing Continental Europe): 2023 (winners)

See also
2019 Challenge Tour graduates

References

External links
 
 
 
 

Polish male golfers
Olympic golfers of Poland
Golfers at the 2020 Summer Olympics
East Tennessee State Buccaneers men's golfers
Sportspeople from Hamburg
1993 births
Living people